Yeoh Kay Bin (born 19 July 1980) is a Malaysian badminton player.

Career 
Yeoh was the champion at the 2003 India Satellite and 2010 Romanian International. In 2007, he won a bronze medal in the Asian Championships, beaten by Chen Hong in the semifinals.

Achievements

Asian Championships 
Men's singles

Finals: 4 (2 titles, 2 runners-up)

References 

1980 births
Living people
People from Perak
Malaysian sportspeople of Chinese descent
Malaysian male badminton players
Competitors at the 2007 Southeast Asian Games
Southeast Asian Games bronze medalists for Malaysia
Southeast Asian Games medalists in badminton
21st-century Malaysian people